Millinocket Lake is  northwest of Millinocket, Maine, and is drained by Millinocket Stream, which flows through the town of Millinocket into the West Branch Penobscot River  south of town. The lake is fed by Sandy Stream, which drains the southeastern slopes of Mount Katahdin by tributaries including Roaring Brook, Avalanche Brook, Spring Brook, Beaver Brook, and Rum Brook. Sandy Stream is a good spawning habitat for rainbow smelt, which are a primary prey for lake trout and land-locked Atlantic salmon living in the lake.

References 

Lakes of Penobscot County, Maine
North Maine Woods
Lakes of Maine